Thomas Günther Eder (born 25 December 1980) is an Austrian football player currently playing for SV Grödig.

National team statistics

External links

1980 births
Living people
Austrian footballers
Austria international footballers
FC Red Bull Salzburg players
SV Ried players
FC Wacker Innsbruck (2002) players

Association football midfielders
Footballers from Salzburg